The Cannonsville Reservoir is a reservoir in the New York City water supply system in Delaware County, New York. It was formed by construction of the Cannonsville Dam on its west end, which impounded over half of the West Branch of the Delaware River. Lying on the western part of the Delaware Watershed, it is the westernmost of New York City's reservoirs. It was placed in service in 1964, and is the most recently constructed New York City-owned reservoir.

The town of Cannonsvile was destroyed to make room for the reservoir, which lies within the towns of Tompkins and Deposit.

Its  drainage basin is the largest of all of the NYC reservoirs. Water from the reservoir flows through the  West Delaware Tunnel into the Rondout Reservoir, before joining the  Delaware Aqueduct, which provides New York City with about 50% of its drinking water.

The Delaware Aqueduct then crosses beneath the Hudson River and continues on to the West Branch Reservoir in Putnam County, New York, then the Kensico Reservoir in Westchester County, both north of the city. It then continues further south to the Hillview Reservoir in Yonkers, where it joins the flows of the Catskill and New Croton aqueducts for distribution through the New York City tunnel system.

The Cannonsville Dam is being considered as a site for a 14.08MW hydroelectric generating station.

Tributaries
 Johnny Brook
 Dry Brook
 Sherruck Brook
 Trout Creek
 Loomis Brook
 Chamberlain Brook
 Dryden Brook
 Maxwell Brook
 Fish Brook

See also
List of reservoirs and dams in New York

References

External links

 Final Environmental Assessment for Hydropower License

Delaware River
Catskill/Delaware watersheds
Reservoirs in New York (state)
Protected areas of Delaware County, New York
Reservoirs in Delaware County, New York
Dams completed in 1964
1964 establishments in New York (state)